is the third studio album by Miyavi. It was released on June 1, 2005. Its limited edition comes with the song "Shakespeare ni Sasagu" (シェイクスピアに捧ぐ) instead of tracks eleven and twelve. It charted 10th on Oricon.

Track listing

References

2005 albums
Miyavi albums
Free-Will albums

sv:Miyavizm